United States gubernatorial elections were held in 1907, in eight states.

Kentucky, Louisiana, Maryland and Mississippi held their gubernatorial elections in odd numbered years, every 4 years, preceding the United States presidential election year. New Jersey at this time held gubernatorial elections every 3 years, which it would abandon in 1949. Massachusetts and Rhode Island both elected its governors to a single-year term; this was the last time Rhode Island elected its governors to a single-year term, switching to two years from the 1912 election.

Oklahoma held its first gubernatorial election on achieving statehood.

Results

References

 
November 1907 events